Francesco Pignatelli (6 February 1652 – 15 December 1734) was an Italian cardinal.

Biography
Born at Senise, in the province of Potenza, he entered the order of Theatines in 1665 (at the age of 13). On 27 September 1684, after being nominated by King Charles II of Spain, he was elected archbishop of Taranto. He was recruited by Pope Clement XI to be nuncio to Poland, where he attempted to work on the schism between Catholics and Ruthenians (Ukrainians and Polish). On 19 February 1703 he was transferred to the metropolitan see of Naples and occupied it until his death.

Although he was nephew of Pope Innocent XII (1691–1700), he was created cardinal only by his successor Clement XI on 17 December 1703. As cardinal he was awarded the titular priest for the church of Santi Marcellino e Pietro al Laterano (11 February 1704 – 26 April 1719), bishop of Sabina (26 April 1719 – 12 June 1724), bishop of Frascati (12 June 1724 – 19 November 1725) and bishop of Porto e Santa Rufina (from 19 November 1725 until his death).

In the papal conclave, 1721 Spain vetoed his election to the pontificate. He became Dean of the Sacred College of Cardinals in June 1726 but declined the promotion to the suburbicarian see of Ostia e Velletri (proper of the dean) and retained the see of Porto e S. Rufina. He died at Naples.

References

External links

 https://web.archive.org/web/20120221225138/http://www.diocesituscolana.it/cronologia/resfrascati.asp?idx=fp1724

People from the Province of Potenza
18th-century Italian cardinals
Cardinal-bishops of Frascati
Cardinal-bishops of Porto
Cardinal-bishops of Sabina
Archbishops of Naples
Deans of the College of Cardinals
1652 births
1734 deaths
Apostolic Nuncios to Poland
Theatines
Francesco
Theatine bishops